NAAC may refer to:
National Albanian American Council, an ethnic advocacy group
National Assessment and Accreditation Council, an organization that assesses and accredits institutions of higher education in India.
North Africa American Cemetery and Memorial, near Carthage, Tunisia.
North American Anglican Conference, a federation of Continuing Anglican church bodies in the United States and Canada.
NaAc, the chemical compound Sodium Acetate.
2-oxo-3-(5-oxofuran-2-ylidene)propanoate lactonase, an enzyme
 the National Association of Agency Companies, the historical name for the U.S. Direct Selling Association